Beneath Two Suns is an adventure for fantasy role-playing games published by Mayfair Games in 1986.

Plot summary
Beneath Two Suns is a scenario for character levels 6 – 8 located on the planet Kregen, setting for the "Dray Prescott" science-fantasy novels written by Alan Burt Akers.  The adventure takes place in a port similar to Italian cities of the Renaissance.  The adventurers are embroiled in intrigues between several noble houses as they try to recover a kidnapped princess.  It includes statistics for the "Dray Prescott" characters and rules for Florentine fighting (i.e., with sword in right hand and dagger in left).

In this adventure, the player characters are supplied, from a variety of backgrounds including Victorian London.  The adventure begins with characters flung into a sort of limbo, and they wake up in chains breaking rocks in a quarry on the world of Kregen.  The adventure includes some notes on local culture and wildlife, taken from the novels.  Much of the adventure is laid out similarly to a gamebook.

Publication history
Beneath Two Suns was written by Troy Denning, with a cover by Ken Kelly and illustrations by Todd Hamilton, and was published by Mayfair Games in 1986 as a 32-page book.

Reception
Graeme Davis reviewed Beneath Two Suns for White Dwarf #90. He admitted that he had read a couple of the Prescott books, but "wasn't particularly struck by them; hardened fans may well get more out of this adventure than I did". He calls the adventure "a complicated piece of skullduggery, as can be seen from the daunting-looking flowchart at the front". He found that the gamebook-like format "may restrict the party's possible actions uncomfortably.  Having said that, though, there is a nice balance between fighting and role-playing [...] especially if the GM is prepared to put in a bit of preparation work and wing it if the party get away from the expected plot."

References

Fantasy role-playing game adventures
Role Aids
Role-playing game supplements introduced in 1986